Rosaleen Philomena Linehan (born 1 June 1937) is an Irish stage, screen and television actress.

Career

Linehan was born in Dublin. She attended University College Dublin and graduated in 1957 with a Bachelor of Arts degree in Economics and Politics. She joined UCD Dramsoc on her first day of college and started acting professionally within two years of leaving the university. She has appeared in many comedy revues written by her husband Fergus. She has appeared on stage in, among other plays, Blithe Spirit, The House of Bernarda Alba and Twelfth Night She was nominated for Best Featured Actress in a Play for her role as Kate in Brian Friel's Dancing at Lughnasa at the 1992 Tony Awards. She starred as Winnie in Samuel Beckett's Happy Days on stage and on screen as part of the Beckett on Film project, having already played the role in a 1996 production at the Gate Theatre opposite Barry McGovern.

In 1972, Linehan won a Jacob's Award for her RTÉ Radio comedy series Get an Earful of This. She was the recipient of the Lifetime Achievement Award at the Irish Theatre Awards in 2008.

In film, she has appeared as Nurse Callan in Ulysses, May Dedalus in A Portrait of the Artist as a Young Man (1977), Aunt Fitzeustace in Fools of Fortune, Mrs Canning in The Butcher Boy, Peggy Owens in About Adam, Mrs Matson in The Hi-Lo Country and Millie O'Dowd in The Matchmaker. In television, she was a voice artist on the Irish language children's TV series Inis Cúil in 2005, appeared in Hugh Leonard's BBC sitcom Me Mammy. More recently, she played Deirdre O Kane's mother in Bitter Sweet.

In 2014, she was awarded the UCD Alumni Award for Arts.

Family
Linehan was married to Fergus Linehan who died in 2016 with whom she had four children, and eight grandchildren. Linehan lives in Dublin. Her father Daniel McMenamin was a Teachta Dála for Donegal from 1927 to 1961.

Filmography
 Snakes and Ladders (1996)

References

External links

1937 births
Living people
Irish film actresses
Irish stage actresses
Jacob's Award winners
Actresses from Dublin (city)
Irish radio presenters
Irish women radio presenters
Radio personalities from the Republic of Ireland